The 1972 2. divisjon was a Norwegian second-tier football league season.

The league was contested by 35 teams, divided into a total of four groups; A and B (non-Northern Norwegian teams) and two district groups which contained teams from Northern Norway: district IX–X and district XI. The winners of group A and B were promoted to the 1973 1. divisjon, while the winners of the district groups qualified for the Northern Norwegian final. The second placed teams in group A and B met the winner of the district IX–X in a qualification round where the winner was promoted to 1. divisjon. The winner of district XI was not eligible for promotion. The bottom team in group A and B were relegated to the 3. divisjon. The two second last teams in group A and B met in a qualification round where the losing team was relegated to the 3. divisjon.

Overview

Summary
Start won group A with 24 points. Frigg won group B with 29 points. Both teams promoted to the 1973 1. divisjon. Raufoss won the qualification play-offs and was also promoted.

Tables

Group A

Group B

District IX–X

District XI

Promotion play-offs

Results
Mo – Raufoss Fotball 0–4
Pors – Mo 2–2
Raufoss Fotball – Pors 2–2

Raufoss won the qualification round and won promotion to the 1. divisjon.

Play-off table

Relegation play-offs

Results
Brumunddal – Bryne 3–2
Bryne – Brumunddal 2–1

4–4 on aggregate.

Replay
Bryne – Brumunddal 4–0

Bryne won the qualification round and remained in the 2. divisjon. Brummunddal was relegated to the 3. divisjon.

Northern Norwegian Final
A Northern Norwegian Final was played between the winners of the two district groups, Mo and Stein. 

Mo – Stein 6–1

References

Norwegian First Division seasons
1972 in Norwegian football
Norway
Norway